Frederick John Litchfield was a New Zealand settler who served as the first mayor of Blenheim.

Biography
Frederick was born in 1820 at Cambridge, England, travelling to New Zealand in 1853 where he settled at Motueka and worked as a schoolmaster. By 1858, he was settled at the infant town of Beaver where he worked John Symon's store and ran the Beaver Inn. In June 1869, he was elected as one of nine members of the first Marlborough Borough Council and was elected as their first mayor.

Personal life
Fredrick died at Hastings, South East England on 18 February 1900 at the age of eighty. He was buried at Omaka Cemetery.

References

1820 births
People from Cambridge
Mayors of Blenheim, New Zealand
19th-century New Zealand politicians